Aguirre is the seventh album by German band Popol Vuh. It contains music used in the soundtrack to Werner Herzog's film Aguirre, the Wrath of God (1972), first released as an album in 1975 on Ohr, and reissued in 2004 by SPV with one bonus track. This score was the first of many filmic collaborations between the group and Herzog.  Only two tracks ("Aguirre I" and "Aguirre II") are from the film; the rest were gathered from various recordings done by the group during the period 1972–74, including alternative versions of two songs ("Morgengruß II" and "Agnus Dei") originally released on the band's 1974 album, Einsjäger und Siebenjäger.

Track listing
All tracks composed by Florian Fricke except track number 2 composed by Daniel Fichelscher.

Personnel

Florian Fricke – piano (on track 4), Moog synthesizer, Choir-Organ (on tracks 1, 3, 5, and (on SPV release only) 6)
Daniel Fichelscher – electric guitar (on tracks 2, 3, and 4), acoustic guitar (on tracks 2, 3 and 4), drums (on track 4)
Djong Yun – vocals 
Robert Eliscu – oboe (on track 4), pan pipe (on track 1, part b ["Flöte"]), (also believed to be playing) flute (on track 4)
 Holger Trülzsch (uncredited) – African and Turkish percussion ([on SPV release] on track 6)
 Conny Veit (uncredited, but believed to be there) – Electric guitar (on tracks 1 and 3)

Cover versions 
 Dernière Volonté – "Der Zorn Gottes" from the album Le Feu Sacré

References

External links 
 http://www.furious.com/perfect/populvuh2.html (Comprehensive article & review of every album)
 http://www.headheritage.co.uk/unsung/thebookofseth/popol-vuh-music-from-the-film-aguirre
 https://web.archive.org/web/20080119184752/http://www.enricobassi.it/popvuhdiscografia70.htm (featuring the original credits)
 http://www.venco.com.pl/~acrux/aguirre.htm

Drama film soundtracks
Popol Vuh (band) soundtracks
1975 soundtrack albums